Meyrieu-les-Étangs is a commune in the Isère department in southeastern France.

Populagion

Twin towns
Meyrieu-les-Étangs is twinned with:

  Piringsdorf, Austria, since 1995

See also
Communes of the Isère department

References

Communes of Isère
Isère communes articles needing translation from French Wikipedia